The El Dorado AVA is an American Viticultural Area located in El Dorado County, California, United States. Wine grape growers in the region produce a large diversity of varietals, notable varietals are Zinfandel, Barbera, Cabernet Sauvignon, Merlot and Petite Sirah and there are significant plantings of Rhône varietals. The region benefits from the cool breezes that come off the mountains and push hot air off the vines and down to the valley. The soils of the region are magma based with high levels of acidity.

Established in 1983, The El Dorado American Viticultural Area (AVA, also referred to as an "appellation") includes those portions of El Dorado County bounded on the north by the Middle Fork of the American River, and on the south by the South Fork of the Cosumnes River. El Dorado is a sub-appellation of the 2,600,000-acre Sierra Foothills AVA — one of the largest appellations in California — which includes portions of the counties of Yuba, Nevada, Placer, El Dorado, Amador, Calaveras, Tuolumne and Mariposa.

The El Dorado appellation is unique due to its high elevation and complex topography. El Dorado's mountain vineyards are perched at elevations high above the large, center state valleys, near sea level. The topography is impacted by cooling breezes off the High Sierra Nevada and the complex mountainous topography creates a diversity of micro-climates and growing conditions not found in other regions in the big central valley or coastal mountain settings. Coastal mountains may have vineyard elevations of 200-1,500 feet above sea level (up to 500 meters), where El Dorado wineries tend to start at 1,200 and elevate to 3,500 feet above sea level (1,000 meters) or even higher in some vineyards.

These micro climates provide ideal locations for growing a wide variety of grapes identified with the world's finest wine regions, including Bordeaux, the Rhône, Germany, Italy and Spain. El Dorado grows approximately 70 or more different varieties of grapes, ranging from Gewürztraminer, which does best in the higher and cooler portions of the county, to Zinfandel and Barbera, which ripen perfectly in warmer climates. A significant culture of Rhone varietals are cultivated in the El Dorado AVA for many decades already including significant plantings of Viognier, Syrah, Mourvedre and Grenache grapes.

El Dorado is cooled by elevation rather than by the fog that is common to the coastal regions.  This means the grapes receive more direct sunlight, thus ripening fully without retaining excess herbaceous characters or acidity that is out of balance with the fruit flavors. El Dorado's relatively cool fall temperatures also allow the grapes a long "hang time" for uniform ripening.

In conjunction with the climate, there are three basic soil types determining the characteristics of the region: fine-grained volcanic rock, decomposed granite and fine-grained shale.  Varying in elevation and topography, each soil offers good drainage and the nutrients needed to encourage vines producing rich, deeply flavored grapes.

The unique combination of climate, soil and topography found in the El Dorado appellation produce wines of distinction, depth and density with a maturity unmatched in other regions. This is El Dorado's "terroir."

History

California's Gold Rush began in El Dorado County 1848 with James Marshall's discovery of gold at Sutter's Mill, on the South Fork of the American River in Coloma. As legions of people flocked to California to claim their fortunes, the region's wine making industry was born.

By 1870, El Dorado County was among the largest wine producers in the state, trailing only Los Angeles and Sonoma counties. The local wine industry flourished until just after the turn of the century when there were approximately 2,000 acres of vines in the county. Shortly thereafter, El Dorado began a gradual decline, brought about by poor economic conditions and a diminishing local population. Prohibition was but the last straw.

Between 1920 and 1960, viticulture virtually disappeared from the county. It wasn't until the late 1960s that wine growing made a resurgence. Following the development of several experimental vineyards, it became apparent that both the climate, soil and mountain altitudes of El Dorado County were ideally suited to the production of high quality, dry table wines. With the opening of Boeger Winery in 1973, El Dorado was once again on its way to becoming an important wine growing region. Other wineries, including Madrona, Sierra Vista, and Lava Cap were some of the other early pioneers, that developed a new, vibrant wine making industry centered around the town of Placerville, and to its east. The wine industry in El Dorado County has grown steadily since that time.

Today, the county is home to more than 2,000 acres of vines, over 70 different varietals are planted, and the county is home to approximately 50 to 60, mostly boutique, or small production wineries. El Dorado was designated an American Viticultural Area (AVA) in 1983.

El Dorado AVA resident wineries
Batia Vineyards

Boeger Winery

Bumgarner Wines

Busby Cellars

Cantiga Wineworks

Cedarville Vineyard

C.G. di Arie

Charles B. Mitchell Vineyards

Chateau Davell

Chateau D' Estienne

Cielo Estate

Cielo Sulla Terra Estate Vineyards and Winery

Conduit Wine

Crystal Basin Cellars

Del Fino Farms

Divittorio Winery

E16 Winery

Element 79 Vineyards

Everhart Cellars

Fenton Herriott Vineyards

Field Number Fifteen Winery

Findleton Estate Winery

Fleur De Lys Winery

David Girard Vineyards 

Golden Leaves Wines

Gold Hill Vineyard & Brewery

Grace Patriot Wines

Gwinllan Estate Winery

Holly's Hill

Illuminare

Iverson Winery

Kehret Vineyards

La Clarine Farm

Lava Cap Winery

Madroña

Mastroserio Winery

Medeiros Family Wines

Mediterranean Vineyards

Mellowood Vineyard

Miraflores

MV Winery

Myka Estates and Cellars

Narrow Gate Vineyards

Nello Olivo Wines

Oakstone Winery

Rucksack Cellars

Sentivo Vineyards

Shadow Ranch

Saluti Cellars

Sierra Vista Vineyards & Winery

Skinner Vineyards

Smokey Ridge Winery

Toogood Winery

Starfield Vineyards

Via Romano Vineyards

Windwalker Vineyards

Wofford Acres

Winery by the Creek

References

External links
El Dorado Wine Association official site

American Viticultural Areas
American Viticultural Areas of California
Geography of El Dorado County, California
1983 establishments in California